Slavko Kvaternik (25 August 1878 – 7 June 1947) was a Croatian Ustaše military general and politician who was one of the founders of the Ustaše movement. Kvaternik was military commander and Minister of Domobranstvo (Armed Forces). On 10 April 1941, he declared the creation of the Independent State of Croatia.
 
Kvaternik was an officer in the Austro-Hungarian Army and was involved in World War I. After the collapse of Austria-Hungary, he was appointed by the National Council of the State of Slovenes, Croats and Serbs to lead a successful incursion into Međimurje in late 1918. He later transferred to the Royal Yugoslav Army and remained there until 1921.

In 1929, he was one of the founders of the Ustasha – Croatian Revolutionary Movement in Italy. After Germany invaded Yugoslavia in April 1941, he declared the creation of the Independent State of Croatia on 10 April 1941 with the support of the Axis. In the newly-created state, he became the Minister of the Armed Forces until 1943, when he retired. Kvaternik was executed for war crimes in 1947.

Early life
Slavko Kvaternik was born in Moravice (then known as Komorske Moravice) in the Kingdom of Croatia-Slavonia of Austria-Hungary on 25 August 1878, the son of Ljudevit, a postman, and his wife, Marija (née Frank), who was of German descent from Bavaria and Catholic by religion.

Slavko Kvaternik married Olga Frank, daughter of Josip Frank, a Croatian nationalist politician of Jewish descent, who converted from Judaism to Roman Catholicism. Their son, Dido, was a member of the Ustasha. At the end of August 1941, Olga Frank committed suicide, probably because of her Jewish origins and the roles of her husband, and (especially) of her son Dido, in the NDH.

Educated in a military academy, Kvaternik served in the Austro-Hungarian Army as an adjutant (1914-1916) of field-marshal Svetozar Boroević during World War I, and was awarded the German Iron Cross 1st Class (1918). In 1918, he joined the newly-formed National Council of Slovenes, Croats and Serbs, becoming the Chief of General Staff.  At the end of the year, Kvaternik commanded Croatian troops during the successful 1918 occupation of Međimurje.

World War II
After the German invasion of the Kingdom of Yugoslavia on 6 April 1941, the Ustaše formed their government with Ante Pavelić as leader. Four days later Kvaternik proclaimed the establishment of the Independent State of Croatia (NDH) and formed the first Ustasha government. At the same time, at Kvaternik's request, Vladko Maček (the leader of the Croatian Peasant Party, who had refused to cooperate with the Germans when they requested he lead the new nation) told the people to cooperate with the new regime.

Kvaternik's position at this time was commander-in-chief of the Croatian Armed Forces. This carried the title of vojskovođa (marshal). The Croatian Home Guard was established on 11 April. He stayed at this position until his retirement on 4 January 1943.

He was awarded the 1st Class Cross of the Military Order of the Iron Trefoil during his service to the NDH. This award gave him the title of vitez (knight), which is sometimes included in his name.

Death
After the Second World War's end, Kvaternik was captured by the United States Army and extradited to Yugoslavia. In Yugoslavia, he was tried and sentenced to death for his crimes under the NDH regime. He was executed by hanging in Zagreb on 7 June 1947.

Awards and decorations
 Iron Cross of 1914, 1st class
 Military Order of the Iron Trefoil, 1st class
 Grand Cross of the Hungarian Order of Merit
 Grand Cross of the Order of Merit of the Republic of Hungary
 Grand Cross of the Order of the German Eagle

References

Further reading

External links
 Biography of Slavko Kvaternik

1878 births
1947 deaths
People from Vrbovsko
People from the Kingdom of Croatia-Slavonia
Croatian people convicted of war crimes
Austro-Hungarian military personnel of World War I
Ustaše
Croatian fascists
Croatian irredentism
Yugoslav anti-communists
Royal Yugoslav Army personnel
Croatian Home Guard personnel
Government ministers of the Independent State of Croatia
Croatian people of World War I
Croatian military personnel of World War II
Croatian collaborators with Nazi Germany
Croatian collaborators with Fascist Italy
Genocide of Serbs in the Independent State of Croatia perpetrators
Executed Yugoslav collaborators with Nazi Germany
Executed Croatian people
Croatian Roman Catholics
Recipients of the Iron Cross (1914), 1st class
Recipients of the Military Order of the Iron Trefoil
Grand Crosses of the Order of Merit of the Republic of Hungary (military)
Holocaust perpetrators in Yugoslavia
Croatian people of German descent
World War II prisoners of war held by the United States
People executed by Yugoslavia by hanging